The Ayes Have It is an album by saxophonist Evan Parker. Tracks 1–4 were recorded in a London studio during December 1983, and feature Parker with bassist Paul Rogers, and, in a rare recorded appearance, percussionist Jamie Muir. The remaining track was recorded live at the Angel and Crown pub in London on August 1, 1991, and features Parker, Rogers, trombonist Wolter Wierbos, and percussionist Mark Sanders. The album was released by Emanem Records in 2001.

Reception

In a review for AllMusic, Steve Loewy wrote: "Parker is in his usually good form at both sessions... While the two sessions have ostensibly little in common... each easily stands on its own as an excellent example of the free improvisational spirit of the period."

The authors of The Penguin Guide to Jazz praised the live track, calling the quartet "an astonishingly good group," and commenting: "we are increasingly persuaded that this is the line-up and these the recordings which clinched the format."

A reviewer for All About Jazz noted "Parker's ability to shoehorn his creativity into whatever niche is available," and stated: "The Eyes Have It is essential listening for any Evan Parker fan, and a fine starting point for afficionado of free improvisation. "

Track listing

 "Aye 1" – 9:16
 "Aye 2" – 4:02
 "Aye 3" – 8:54
 "Aye 4" – 9:29
 "The Eyes Have It" – 36:30

Personnel 
 Evan Parker – tenor saxophone, soprano saxophone
 Paul Rogers – bass
 Jamie Muir – percussion, toys (tracks 1–4)
 Wolter Wierbos – trombone (track 5)
 Mark Sanders – percussion (track 5)

References

2001 live albums
Live free jazz albums
Evan Parker live albums